Alexander Nagy (born 8 May 1974) is a Slovak water polo player. He competed in the men's tournament at the 2000 Summer Olympics.

References

1974 births
Living people
Slovak male water polo players
Olympic water polo players of Slovakia
Water polo players at the 2000 Summer Olympics
Sportspeople from Košice